The Catholic Church in Mozambique is part of the worldwide Catholic Church, under the spiritual leadership of the Pope in Rome.

There are over 8,784 million Catholics (30.5%) in Mozambique, a former Portuguese colony.
The country is divided into twelve dioceses including three archdioceses.

The first mission was started by Portuguese Franciscans in 1500.

Dioceses
 Archdiocese of Beira 
Archdiocese of Maputo
Archdiocese of Nampula 
Diocese of Chimoio 
Diocese of Gurué 
Diocese of Inhambane 
Diocese of Lichinga 
Diocese of Nacala 
Diocese of Pemba 
Diocese of Quelimane 
Diocese of Tete  
Diocese of Xai-Xai

References

Sources
 CRUZ CORREIA,  Francisco Augusto da, O Método missionário dos Jesuítas em Moçambique, 1881.1910. Um contributo para a História da Missão da Zambézia,  Braga: Livraria A.I., 1991, 471p.
 FERREIRA, L., Igreja Ministerial em Moçambique. Caminhos de hoje e de amanhã (Lisbon, 1987)
 LUZIA, J., “A Igreja das Palhotas. Génese da Igreja em Moçambique, entre o Colonialismo e a Independencia”, Cadernos de Estudos Africanos (Lisbon), 4 (1989), 127p.
 MORIER-GENOUD, Eric, Catholicism and the Making of Politics in Central Mozambique, 1940-1980, Rocherster: Rochester University Press, coll. ‘Rochester Studies in African History and the Diaspora’, 2019
 MORIER-GENOUD, Eric  & ANOUILH, Pierre  “Revolution, War and Democracy. The Catholic Church in Mozambique” in Paul C. Manuel, Alynna Lyon & Clyde Wilcox (eds), Religion and Politics in a Global Society. Comparative Perspectives from the Portuguese-Speaking World (Lanham: Lexington, 2012)
 MORIER-GENOUD, Eric, “The Vatican vs. Lisbon. The relaunching of the Catholic church in Mozambique, ca. 1875-1940”, BAB Working Papers, Basel (Switzerland), n°4, 2002, 16p
 SCHEBESTA, Paul., Portugals Konquistamission in Südost-Afrika (Steyler, St. Augustin, 1966)
 SILVA, Anónio da, Mentalidade missiológica dos Jesuítas em Moçambique antes de 1759. Esboço ideológico a partir do núcleo documental, Lisbon : Junta de Investigação do Ultrama, 1967, 2 vol.
 SOUSA, José Augusto Alves de, Os Jesuítas em Moçambique, 1541-1991. No cinquentenário do quarto período da nossa Missão, Braga: Libraria Apostolado da Imprensa, 1991
 SOUSA, José. Augusto Alves de & CORREIA, F. da C., 500 anos de evangelização em Moçambique (Paulinas, Maputo, 1998)
 

 
Mozambique
Mozambique